Michael Belet (fl. 1182) was an English judge, sheriff of Worcestershire 1176-81 and again in 1184, of Wiltshire 1180-82, of Leicestershire and Warwickshire in conjunction with Ralph Glanvill 1185-87, and alone 1189-00. He appears as a justice itinerant for Warwickshire and Leicestershire in 1177, in the following year for Lincolnshire, and in 1179, on the redistribution of circuits which then took place, he was assigned for the eastern circuit.

On several occasions between the latter years of Henry II's reign and the third of John, 1201-2, we find him acting as tallager in various counties. He is classed as a baron in the record of a fine levied before him in the exchequer in 1183, and in 1189-90 we find him acting with the barons in assessing imposts in the midland counties. He was lord of the Shene Manor in Surrey, and of that Wroxton Manor in Oxfordshire. He married Emma, daughter and coheir of John de Keynes, by whom he had several sons, of whom the eldest was named Hervey after his grandfather, and the second Michael. The last fine recorded by Dugdale as having been levied before him is dated 1199. He likely died early in the thirteenth century. On his death his estates passed to his eldest son, Hervey, who, however, dying in 1207-8 without issue, was succeeded by his brother Michael, who paid a fine of £100 upon the succession.

References

Attribution

12th-century English judges
High Sheriffs of Worcestershire
High Sheriffs of Leicestershire
High Sheriffs of Warwickshire